Family of Cops is a 1995 American-Canadian made-for-television crime drama film from Trimark Pictures, directed by Ted Kotcheff and starring Charles Bronson, Daniel Baldwin, Angela Featherstone, and Sebastian Spence. It was filmed in Milwaukee, Wisconsin, United States and Toronto, Ontario, Canada.

This film is the first in a trilogy, and was followed by Breach of Faith: A Family of Cops 2 (1997) and Family of Cops 3 (1999).

Plot
Milwaukee Police Department inspector Paul Fein (Charles Bronson) is a veteran police commander whose eldest son Ben (Daniel Baldwin) is a senior police detective, whose older daughter Kate (Barbara Williams) is a public defender who takes her job very seriously, and whose younger son Eddie (Sebastian Spence) is also a cop assigned to the department's Patrol Bureau. Paul is assigned to investigate the murder of a prominent businessman, and he soon learns that the field of suspects has been narrowed down to the victim's sexually freewheeling wife Anna (Lesley-Anne Down) and Paul's wild-child daughter Jackie (Angela Featherstone). Neither Paul, Ben, nor Eddie believe that Jackie could have committed the murder, and soon Paul is using himself as a decoy in a bid to find out more about what Anna does and does not know about her husband's death.

Cast

 Charles Bronson as Commissioner Paul Fein
 Daniel Baldwin as Ben Fein
 Barbara Williams as Kate Fein
 Angela Featherstone as Jackie Fein
 Sebastian Spence as Eddie Fein

References

External links
 
 

1995 television films
1995 films
1990s crime drama films
American crime drama films
Canadian crime drama films
Canadian drama television films
Crime television films
English-language Canadian films
Films set in Milwaukee
Films directed by Ted Kotcheff
CBS network films
Trimark Pictures films
1990s English-language films
American drama television films
1990s American films
1990s Canadian films